Banbibi, the lady of the forest, also Bandevi, Bandurga and Byaghradevi is a guardian spirit of the forests venerated by both the Hindu and the Muslim residents of the Sundarbans (the largest mangrove forest in the world spread across Southern Bangladesh and West Bengal in eastern India north of Bay of Bengal and home to the Bengal Tigers) . She is called upon mostly by the honey-collectors and the woodcutters before entering the forest for protection against the attacks from the tigers. It is believed that the demon king, Dakkhin Rai (or Dakshin Rai; meaning Lord of the South), an arch-enemy of Banbibi actually appears in the disguise of a tiger and attacks human beings.

The narratives of Banbibi

The narratives of Banbibi are found in several texts named as the Banbibir Keramati (the magical deeds of Banbibi) or the Banbibir Jahuranama (glory to Banbibi). Amongst its earliest poets, Bayanuddin and Munshi Mohammad Khater are well known and their texts in the Bengali verse meter known as dwipodi-poyar (the two-footed line) are almost similar and are heavily influenced by Persian and Quranic Arabic. These texts consist of two major episodes, her battle with Dakkhin Rai and the narrative of Dukhe.

In The Hungry Tide, his  2004 environmentalist novel, Amitav Ghosh mentioned two accounts of the Banbibi story of "Dukhey's Redemption." In River of Fire, Qurratulain Hyder mentions in a footnote that "Ban-Bibi" is Fatima, daughter of prophet Muhammad and she is revered as the patroness of the woods by the forest dwelling Muslims of Bengal.

Battle with Dakkhin Rai
Banbibi is believed as the daughter of Berahim (Ibrahim), a fakir from Mecca. When his first wife Phulbibi could not bear any child, Ibrahim (locally known as Berahim) married Golalbibi with Phulbibi's permission tagged with a condition of fulfilling a wish of her in future. At the same time, God decided to send Banbibi and Shah Jangali from heaven for a divine mission. He instructed them to take birth as the children of Golalbibi. When Golalbibi became pregnant, Ibrahim left her in a forest to satisfy his first wife's wish, as he promised her earlier. Banbibi and Shah Jangali were born in the forest to Golalbibi. Allah sent four maids from heaven to take care of them. Golalbibi abandoned Banbibi in the forest left with Shah Jangali in her arms. Banbibi was raised in the forest by a doe. After seven years, Ibrahim understood his mistake and took back Golalbibi and her two children to Mecca.

Once, while praying at the mosque of the prophet of Islam, Banbibi and Shah Jangali received two magical hats. With the help of those magical hats, they flew to the country of eighteen tides (atharo bhatir desh) in Hindustan (but, according to another version of the narrative, they were brought to the country of eighteen tides by Gibril).  After reaching there, Shah Jangali gave the adhan (call to prayer). The country of eighteen tides (the Sundarbans) was under the control of the demon king Dakkhin Rai, till their arrival. The sound of adhan reached his ears. He sent his friend Sanatan Rai to enquire about them. When, Sanatan informed him about the duo, he decided to throw them out of his territory. While he was about to go into the battle, his mother Narayani prevented him from going and she herself went with her army of ghosts and goblins to fight them. Banbibi defeated Narayani after a long battle. But out of mercy, she returned the half of the erstwhile kingdom of Narayani and her son. Narayani became a friend of Banbibi. While the inhabited part of the Sunderbans is believed as the realm of Banbibi, Dakkhin Rai is believed as the ruler of the deep forest.

Narrative of Dukhe
Once, there were two Moule (honey collector) brothers, Dhona and Mona (or Dhanai and Manai) in a village named Barijhati. Dhona planned to go for an expedition with a fleet of seven boats to collect honey in a mahal (dense forest) of the country of the eighteen tides but his brother Mona opposed it. He took a poor shepherd boy, Dukhe along with him. Before leaving, Dukhe's mother told him to remember Banbibi in case of any serious trouble. When the fleet reached the Kendokhali char, which was a part of the kingdom of Dakkhin Rai, Dhona forgot to give an offering to Dakkhin Rai. As a result, he was not able to collect any honey or wax for three days. On the third night, Dakkhin Rai appeared in Dhona's dreams and asked him for a human sacrifice. After some arguments with Dakkhin Rai, greedy Dhona agreed to sacrifice Dukhe in exchange for honey and wax. So, after collecting enough wax and honey, he left Dukhe there and returned to his village. When Dukhe was about to be killed by Dakkhin Rai in the disguise of a tiger, he started chanting prayers invoking Banbibi. On hearing his chant, Banbibi came along with her brother Shah Jangali to save him. Shah Jangali defeated Dakkhin Rai. After his defeat, Dakkhin Rai took refuge with Bara Khan Ghazi (Gazi Pir). Banbibi and Shah Jangali followed Dakkhin Rai there. Finally, Bara Khan Ghazi was able to convince Banbibi not to harm Dakkhin Rai. In return, Ghazi gave Dukhe seven carts full of precious items, while Rai gave him a sufficient amount of wax and honey. Banbibi ordered her pet crocodile, Seko, to drop him to his village. After his return to the village, Dukhe popularised the worship of Banbibi in the neighbouring areas. Later, Dhona married his daughter Champa to Dukhe, who had become the Chaudhury (chief) of the village.

Iconography
Banbibi is worshipped by her Hindu followers as Bandurga, Bandevi or as Banbibi, and her predominantly Hindu images are found as wearing a crown and garland, carrying a club and trishul and her vahana (vehicle) is a tiger. She is venerated by her Muslim followers as Banbibi and she is known as a pirani. Her predominantly Muslim images are found with braided hair, wearing a cap with a tikli. She wears ghagra and pyjama (instead of a sari) and a pair of shoes. Both Hindu and Muslim images have a boy in her lap, believed as Dukhe by her worshippers. Her vahana (mount) is a tiger or a hen.

Shrines of Banbibi
In most of the shrines of Banbibi in the Sundarbans, Banbibi is worshipped along with her brother Shah Jangali and Dakkhin Rai.

Appearances in literature
The story of Bonbibi is prominent in Amitav Ghosh's The Hungry Tide, Jungle Nama and also referred to in the same author's The Great Derangement: Climate Change and the Unthinkable.

See also
 Gazi Pir
 Jungle Nama (2021 verse adaptation)

Notes

Further reading

External links
 A predominantly Muslim image of Banbibi
  The journal Indian Folklife has Annu Jalais's "Bonbibi:  Bridging Worlds" which summarizes Abdur Rahim's nineteenth century text in page 7.
Bonbibi

Culture of West Bengal
Bangladeshi culture
Bengali culture
Sundarbans